Mtiskalta Church of Transfiguration is a church in the village of , Sokhumi municipality, Autonomous Republic of Abkhazia, Georgia. The church was built in the 19th century.

Not to be confused with ruins of nearby Mtiskalta Church built in  19th and 20th centuries.

External links 
Mtiskalta Church of the Transfiguration Historical monuments of Abkhazia — Government of the Autonomous Republic of Abkhazia.

References 

Religious buildings and structures in Georgia (country)
Religious buildings and structures in Abkhazia
Churches in Abkhazia